André Dias (born 1979) is a Brazilian football centre-back

André Dias may also refer to:

 André Dias de Escobar (1348–1448), Portuguese Benedictine theologian
 André Dias (footballer, born 1981), Brazilian football striker
 André Dias (footballer, born 1992), Portuguese football left-back
 André Dias (footballer, born 2001), Portuguese football midfielder

See also
 Andrew Dias (born 1998), Canadian soccer defender